Defending champion Ivan Lendl defeated Stefan Edberg in the final, 4–6, 7–6(7–3), 5–2 ret., to win the men's singles tennis title at the 1990 Australian Open. Edberg was forced to retire during the third set of the final due to a torn stomach muscle. This marked the first occasion since the 1911 Wimbledon Championships that a man withdrew during the championship match of a singles major.

Former world No. 1 John McEnroe created controversy after he was disqualified from his fourth round match for unsportsmanlike conduct. He received a warning for intimidating a linesperson, a point penalty after smashing his racket, and was defaulted for arguing with and abusing the umpire, supervisor and tournament referee.

Seeds

 Ivan Lendl (champion)
 Boris Becker (quarterfinals)
 Stefan Edberg (final, retired because of a torn stomach muscle injury)
 John McEnroe (fourth round, defaulted for unsportsmanlike conduct)
 Aaron Krickstein (fourth round)
 Tim Mayotte (first round)
 Emilio Sánchez (first round)
 Mats Wilander (semifinals)

 Andrés Gómez (fourth round)
 Carl-Uwe Steeb (first round)
 Andrei Chesnokov (second round)
 Yannick Noah (semifinals)
 Sergi Bruguera (second round)
 Jim Courier (second round)
 Thomas Muster (third round)
 Miloslav Mečíř (fourth round)

Qualifying

Draw

Finals

Top half

Section 1

Section 2

Section 3

Section 4

Bottom half

Section 5

Section 6

Section 7

Section 8

Notes

a.  No. 1 seed Ivan Lendl won the final after No. 3 seed Stefan Edberg was forced to retire in the third set with a torn stomach muscle injury.
b.  Mikael Pernfors advanced to the quarterfinals after No. 4 John McEnroe was defaulted in the fourth set by chair umpire Gerry Armstrong for unsportsmanlike conduct.
c.  David Wheaton advanced to the fourth round after Mark Woodforde was forced to retire in the second set with a right ankle injury.

References
General

Specific

External links
 1990 Australian Open – Men's draws and results at the International Tennis Federation

Mens singles
Australian Open (tennis) by year – Men's singles